Lakewood Theater may refer to:

Lakewood Theater (Madison, Maine), listed on the NRHP in Somerset County, Maine
Lakewood Theater (Dallas, Texas)